Rragam may refer to:

Rragam, Shkodër, Albania 
Ramazan Rragami (born 1944), Albanian football player and coach
Ferid Rragami (born 1957), Albanian footballer